Catherine McGrath (born 9 June 1997) is a Northern Irish country music singer and songwriter.

Career

Early life
Born in Rostrevor, Northern Ireland, McGrath learned guitar from her grandmother, who taught her to play and sing "The Lion Sleeps Tonight". McGrath's parents are both musicians and were frequent performers at the annual Fiddler's Green Music Festival held in County Down, Northern Ireland. McGrath honed her skills by observing her parents on-stage and by watching instructional videos online. McGrath took up songwriting, and in addition to performing her own material, she began making homemade videos of herself performing current pop hits, which she then posted online. McGrath has said that her country music influences include Taylor Swift, Kacey Musgraves, Kelsea Ballerini, Brad Paisley, and Rascal Flatts; she credits Swift's song "Love Story" in particular for introducing her to country music at the age of 12.

2016–present: Signing with Warner Bros. Records and debut studio album
McGrath's videos attracted the attention of Instrumental, a company that finds talent online and grooms them for larger success. She moved to London to work for the company, and after only a few months, began travelling to Nashville for songwriting and studio sessions. In the summer of 2016, McGrath signed with Warner Bros. She recorded and released her first solo EP One in December later that same year. Her major label debut album, Talk of This Town, was released on 27 July 2018. McGrath played a set at the C2C: Country to Country festival in 2019 and joined Hunter Hayes on stage at the O2 Arena to duet on their song "Don't Let Me Forget".

Discography

Studio albums

Extended plays

Singles

Music Videos

Writing credits

Recognition 
In 2018, McGrath was fan-voted as the winner of the International Emerging Artist of The Year award in the Music For A New Generation Awards, run by Australian country radio program, Planet Country.

References

External links
 

1997 births
Living people
21st-century singers from Northern Ireland
British songwriters
British country singers
Country pop musicians